Valentinus Lublinus, also known as Walenty Lublin, was a 16th-century Polish physician and editor of medical texts. He was a student of Johannes Baptista Montanus at the University of Padua, and collected, edited and published several volumes of his teacher's lectures two years after Montanus's death. One of these volumes was "explanations" of Galen, published in 1556.

The surname Lublinus indicates that he was from Lublin, a center of literary and intellectual activity during the Polish Renaissance. Lublinus's Latinized name also sometimes appears with the cognomen Polonus, an additional toponym to indicate that he was from Poland.

References

Further reading
V. Nutton, "The Reception of Fracastoro's Theory of Contagion: The Seed That Fell among Thorns?" Osiris 6 (1990) 196–234.

External links
Editions of Montanus by Lublinus include:
 De excrementis
 In artem parvam Galeni explanationes
 Consultationum medicinalium centuria prima

16th-century births
16th-century deaths
Polish Renaissance humanists
Polish medical writers
16th-century Polish physicians
16th-century Polish writers
16th-century male writers